Jack and the Beanstalk is a 1931 Fleischer Studios Talkartoon animated short film starring Bimbo and Betty Boop.

Synopsis
Associated with the fairy tale Jack and the Beanstalk, Bimbo plants some magic beans which grow into a gigantic beanstalk. He then climbs to the top of the beanstalk where he finds Betty Boop who is enslaved and forced to cook for the Hungry Giant. Bimbo rescues Betty from the Giant and they both escape on a flying magical hen.

References

External links
 Jack and the Beanstalk at IMDB
 Jack and the Beanstalk at the Cartoon Database

1931 films
Films based on Jack and the Beanstalk
Betty Boop cartoons
1930s American animated films
American black-and-white films
1931 animated films
Paramount Pictures short films
Fleischer Studios short films
Short films directed by Dave Fleischer